Achilla is a genus of planthoppers belonging to the family Achilidae.

Species:

Achilla hecate 
Achilla marginatifrons 
Achilla nyx

References

Achilidae